Manono may refer to:

 Manono Island, Samoa
 Manono, Democratic Republic of the Congo (Tanganyika Province)
 Manono, the Māori name given to plants of the Coprosma species Coprosma grandifolia, found in New Zealand
 Manono, the Hawaiian name given to various species of plants in the family Rubiaceae, at different times in recent years officially classified as being in the genera Hedyotis, Kadua, or Gouldia
Manono I
Manono II